Spickard may refer to:

Spickard, Missouri, city in Grundy County, Missouri, United States
Mount Spickard, mountain of Whatcom County, Washington, United States

People with the surname
Paul Spickard (born 1950), American historian